Pambasso is a village in eastern Ivory Coast. It is in the sub-prefecture of Transua, Transua Department, Gontougo Region, Zanzan District.

Until 2012, Pambasso was in the commune of Pambasso-Diédou. In March 2012, Pambasso-Diédou became one of 1126 communes nationwide that were abolished.

Notes

Populated places in Zanzan District
Populated places in Gontougo